Magnets and Ghosts (sometimes stylized as Magnets & Ghosts) are an American alternative rock band from Atlanta, Georgia. The duo consists of Dean Roland and Ryan Potesta. They released their debut album, Mass, on November 1, 2011.

History
Potesta first met Roland when he worked on the 2007 Collective Soul album Afterwords. The two discovered they had similar taste in music and when Collective Soul went on hiatus in 2010 they decided to form their own band. Beginning in fall 2010, the two began writing songs for what would become their debut album Mass. Mass was released on November 1, 2011. In 2014 they released the EP, Be Born.

Discography

Studio albums

Extended plays

Videography

Music videos

Concert tours
Headlining
 Light My Flame Tour (2013)

References

External links
Official website

2010 establishments in Georgia (U.S. state)
Alternative rock groups from Georgia (U.S. state)
American musical duos
Male musical duos
Musical groups established in 2010
Musical groups from Atlanta
Rock music duos